Frederic Fenimore Forrest Jr. (born December 23, 1936) is an American actor. Forrest came to public attention for his performance in When the Legends Die (1972), which earned him a nomination for the Golden Globe Award for Most Promising Newcomer. He went on to receive Academy and Golden Globe Award nominations in the Best Supporting Actor category for his portrayal of Huston Dyer in musical drama The Rose (1979).

Forrest portrayed Jay "Chef" Hicks in Francis Ford Coppola's epic war film Apocalypse Now (1979), and collaborated with Coppola on four other films: The Conversation (1974), One from the Heart (1982), Hammett (1982) and Tucker: The Man and His Dream (1988). Other credits include The Missouri Breaks (1976), The Two Jakes (1990) and Falling Down (1993), along with the television series 21 Jump Street, Lonesome Dove and Die Kinder.

Life and career

Forrest was born on December 23, 1936, in Waxahachie, Texas, the son of Virginia Allie (née McSpadden) and Frederic Fenimore Forrest, a furniture store owner whose greenhouses provided plants for sale in retail stores.

In 1966, Forrest began acting on stage in an off-Broadway production of Viet Rock. His film debut was in When the Legends Die (1973).

Forrest is known for his roles as Chef in Apocalypse Now, the neo-Nazi surplus store owner in Falling Down, and Dashiell Hammett in Hammett (1982) and Citizen Cohn (1992). He had a role as the Native American bandit Blue Duck in the 1989 miniseries, Lonesome Dove. He was Academy Award-nominated in the Supporting Actor category for his role in The Rose. He was married to Marilu Henner from 1980 to 1982.

He also appeared in Valley Girl, The Two Jakes, The Stone Boy, The Missouri Breaks, The Deliberate Stranger (TV), Promise Him Anything (TV) and horror maestro Dario Argento's first American film, Trauma.

On television, he played Captain Richard Jenko on the first season of the Fox Television series 21 Jump Street, in 1987. Forrest was subsequently replaced by actor Steven Williams, who played Captain Adam Fuller for the remainder of the series. In 1990, he appeared as private investigator Lomax in the BBC miniseries Die Kinder. He played Sgt. McSpadden in the Civil War-themed movie Andersonville and real-life U.S. Army General Earle Wheeler in 2002's Path to War, the final film of director John Frankenheimer.

Filmography

References

External links

1936 births
Living people
American male film actors
American male television actors
People from Waxahachie, Texas
Male actors from Texas